The Roman Catholic Diocese of Tambacounda is a diocese located in the city of Tambacounda in the Ecclesiastical province of Dakar in Senegal.

History
 August 13, 1970: Established as Apostolic Prefecture of Tambacounda from the Diocese of Kaolack and Diocese of Saint-Louis du Sénégal
 April 17, 1989: Promoted as Diocese of Tambacounda

Special churches
 The cathedral is Cathédrale Marie Reine de l’Univers in Tambacounda, which is located in the Medina Coura neighborhood of the town.

Leadership
 Prefect Apostolic of Tambacounda (Roman rite) 
 Fr. Clément Cailleau, C.S.Sp. (1970.08.13 – 1986.04.24)
 Bishops of Tambacounda (Roman rite)
 Bishop Jean-Noël Diouf (1989.04.17 – 2017.08.05)
 Bishop Paul Abel Mamba Diatta (2021.11.04 – ...)

See also
Roman Catholicism in Senegal

References

External links
 GCatholic.org
 Catholic Hierarchy 

Roman Catholic dioceses in Senegal
Tambacounda
Christian organizations established in 1970
Roman Catholic dioceses and prelatures established in the 20th century
Roman Catholic Ecclesiastical Province of Dakar